Fort McMurray (South Liege) Aerodrome  is located northwest of Fort McMurray, Alberta, Canada.

See also
List of airports in the Fort McMurray area

References

Registered aerodromes in Fort McMurray